Margaret is a Polish singer and songwriter. She has won various accolades during her career, including five Eska Music Awards out of 11 nominations, a Kids' Choice Award for Favourite Polish Star, and four MTV Europe Music Awards for Best Polish Act out of eight nominations (she was also nominated for Best European Act in 2015). Her third MTV Europe Music Award win in 2018 made her the first and only Polish artist to win the award more than twice, a record she extended in 2020 with her fourth win.

In 2013, Margaret received an award for coming second at the 2013 Baltic Song Contest in Sweden, where she sang her debut single "Thank You Very Much" and a cut from her first EP "I Get Along" against nine other competitors. "Thank You Very Much" also won an award as the third-best selling digital single of 2013 in Poland by a Polish artist, which she was presented at the 2014 Sopot TOPtrendy Festival. The song's controversial music video, which received substantial media coverage for nudity, was named Best Music Video at the 2013 Eska Music Awards.

Margaret has also received two awards at the National Festival of Polish Song: a SuperJedynka award in 2014 and the TVP1 Special Award in 2017. She was recognised by Polish Glamour magazine as Glamour Woman of the Year and Fashion Icon in 2014 and 2015, respectively. Margaret was also honoured with the 2016 Róże Gali ("Gala's Roses") award in the Music category for her collaborative jazz album with Matt Dusk, titled Just the Two of Us. In 2015, the Polish magazine Wprost ("Directly") named her one of the 50 most influential Polish celebrities.

Awards and nominations

Notes

References

External links
 List of awards and nominations at the Internet Movie Database

Margaret
Margaret (singer)